Chatham-Kent—Leamington is a federal electoral district in Ontario. It encompasses a portion of Ontario previously included in the electoral districts of Chatham-Kent—Essex and Essex and Lambton—Kent—Middlesex.

Chatham-Kent—Leamington was created by the 2012 federal electoral boundaries redistribution and was legally defined in the 2013 representation order. It came into effect upon the call of the 42nd Canadian federal election, scheduled for 19 October 2015.

Members of Parliament

This riding has elected the following Members of Parliament:

Election results

Demographics
According to the Canada 2021 Census
Ethnic groups: 84.8% White, 4.7% Indigenous, 2.8% Black, 2.3% Latin American, 1.4% Arab, 1.3% South Asian, 1.0% Southeast Asian
Languages: 80.6% English, 3.6% German, 2.2% French, 1.6% Plautdietsch, 1.6% Spanish, 1.1% Portuguese, 1.0% Arabic
Religions: 67.8% Christian (29.4% Catholic, 7.2% United Church, 4.0% Anglican, 3.0% Anabaptist, 2.6% Baptist, 1.8% Pentecostal, 1.8% Presbyterian, 18.0% Other), 1.3% Muslim, 29.2% None
Median income: $38,400 (2020)
Average income: $47,480 (2020)

References

Ontario federal electoral districts
Chatham-Kent
Leamington, Ontario